Mārtiņš Ķibilds (July 23, 1973 – October 26, 2019) was a Latvian journalist.

Ķibilds hosted Gribi būt miljonārs?, a local version of the game show Who Wants to be a Millionaire?, from its inception in 2002 until 2007. He was producer and host of shows such as Atslēgas, Adreses and Kultūrdeva. Ķibilds was also the chairman of Latvian Architects' Association.

References

Latvian journalists
Who Wants to Be a Millionaire?
1973 births
2019 deaths